The 1923 Dayton Flyers football team was an American football team that represented the University of Dayton as an independent during the 1923 college football season. The team compiled a 4–5 record.

Harry Baujan was hired as Dayton's head football coach prior to the 1923 season. He had played football under Knute Rockne at Notre Dame. In his first game as head coach, Baujan led Dayton to a 161-0 victory over the Indiana Central Normal School.

Baujan served as Dayton's head coach through the 1946 season and was posthumously inducted into the College Football Hall of Fame in 1990.

Schedule

References

Dayton
Dayton Flyers football seasons
Dayton Flyers football